Mulloidichthys is a genus of fish in the family Mullidae native to coral and rocky reefs of the tropical Atlantic, Indian and Pacific Ocean.

Species
There are currently 7 recognized species in this genus:
 Mulloidichthys ayliffe Uiblein, 2011 (Indian mimic goatfish) 
 Mulloidichthys dentatus (T. N. Gill, 1862) (Mexican goatfish)
 Mulloidichthys flavolineatus (Lacépède, 1801)
 M. f. flavicaudus Fernández-Silva & J. E. Randall, 2016 (Yellow-tail goatfish) 
 M. f. flavolineatus (Lacépède, 1801) (Yellow-stripe goatfish)
 Mulloidichthys martinicus (G. Cuvier, 1829) (Yellow goatfish)
 Mulloidichthys mimicus J. E. Randall & Guézé, 1980 (Mimic goatfish)
 Mulloidichthys pfluegeri (Steindachner, 1900) (Orange goatfish)
 Mulloidichthys vanicolensis (Valenciennes, 1831) (Yellow-fin goatfish)

References

Mullidae
Perciformes genera
Taxa named by Gilbert Percy Whitley